Richard Weiss (born 1 July 1973) is an Australian wrestler. He competed in the men's freestyle 68 kg at the 1996 Summer Olympics.

References

External links
 
 

1973 births
Living people
Australian male sport wrestlers
Olympic wrestlers of Australia
Wrestlers at the 1996 Summer Olympics
Sportspeople from Košice